Xəndək or Khandek may refer to:
Xəndək, Qubadli, Azerbaijan
Xəndək, Siazan, Azerbaijan